Orders and decorations conferred to civilians and military personnel in Singapore, listed by order of precedence. Awards specific to the military or police forces are separately listed. All state orders and decorations are styled in the Malay language.

History 
Singapore's national awards were first established in 1962. At the time of establishment, there were only six awards and they were the Darjah Utama Temasek (Order of Temasek), Sijil Kemuliaan (Certificate of Honour), Pingat Gagah Perkasa (Conspicuous Gallantry Medal), Pingat Bakti Cemerlang (Distinguished Service Medal), Pingat Jasa Gemilang (Meritorious Service Medal) and Pingat Bakti Setia (Long Service Award).

The Pingat Pentadbiran Awam (Public Administration Medal) was established in 1963 with three levels, Gangsa, Perak and Emas (Bronze, Silver and Gold respectively). A military equivalent of the same award was introduced in 1981. The Pingat Bakti Masyarakat (Public Service Medal) was also incepted in 1963.

In 1987, Pingat Keberanian (Medal of Valour) was established.

Nominations and awards 
Candidates are nominated every March or April and two different committees recommends the candidates for the various awards. Recommendations are submitted to the Cabinet of Singapore for approval and then the President of Singapore will confer the awards to the recipients.

Military awards are considered by the Armed Forces Council and also submitted to the Cabinet for approval.

The recipients are announced on 9 August, Singapore's National Day, and then given during investiture in November.

Orders and decorations 
Note that the ribbons shown are those used after 1996. For pre-1996 ribbons, see the appropriate award page.

 Bintang Temasek (Star of Temasek) - BT
 Darjah Utama Temasek (Order of Temasek) - DUT
 Darjah Utama Nila Utama (Order of Nila Utama) - DUNU
 Sijil Kemuliaan (Certificate of Honour)
 Darjah Utama Bakti Cemerlang (Distinguished Service Order) - DUBC
 Pingat Kehormatan (Medal of Honour)
 Pingat Gagah Perkasa (Conspicuous Gallantry Medal)
 Pingat Jasa Gemilang (Meritorious Service Medal) - PJG
 Bintang Bakti Masyarakat (Public Service Star) - BBM
 Pingat Pentadbiran Awam, Emas (Public Administration Medal, Gold) - PPA(E)
 Pingat Keberanian (Medal of Valour)
 Pingat Pentadbiran Awam, Perak (Public Administration Medal, Silver) - PPA(P)
 Pingat Pentadbiran Awam, Gangsa (Public Administration Medal, Bronze) - PPA(G)
 Pingat Kepujian (Commendation Medal) - PK
 Pingat Bakti Masyarakat (Public Service Medal) - PBM
 Pingat Berkebolehan (Efficiency Medal) - PB
 Pingat Bakti Setia (Long Service Award) - PBS

References

Prime Minister's Office, Order of Precedence of National Awards for Civilians, 26 March 2010.
Jean-Paul leBlanc, Medals of Singapore, 11 February 2007.
Megan C. Robertson, Decorations and Medals of Singapore, 2 July 2007

Orders, decorations, and medals of Singapore
Singapore and the Commonwealth of Nations